Martín Rivas is a Chilean historical drama television series adaptation of the novel of the same name by Alberto Blest Gana, that aired on TVN and TV Chile from March 15, to September 6, 2010, starring Diego Muñoz and María Gracia Omegna.

Cast

Main characters 
 Diego Muñoz as Martín Rivas.
 María Gracia Omegna as Leonor Encina.
 Álvaro Gómez as Clemente Valencia.
 Amparo Noguera as Engracia Nuñez.
 Paz Bascuñán as Mercedes Rivas.
 Héctor Morales as Captain Ricardo Castaños.
 Andrés Reyes as Amador Molina.

Supporting characters 
 Mauricio Pesutic as Dámaso Encina.
 Pablo Cerda as Rafael San Luis.
 Ignacia Baeza as Matilde Elías
 Álvaro Espinoza as Agustín Encina
 Alejandro Trejo as Fidel Elías
 Berta Lasala as Clara San Luis
 Josefina Velasco as Francisca Encina
 Delfina Guzmán as Candelaria Urbina
 Luis Alarcón as Pedro San Luis
 Solange Lackington as Bernarda Cordero
 Adela Secall as Edelmira Molina
 Alejandra Vega as Adelaida Molina
 Emilio Edwards as Hans Schultz
 Carolina Arredondo as Lidia Fuentes
 Roberto Prieto as Eusebio Pérez
 Mireya Moreno as Etelvina González
 Andrea Elitit as Peta Gómez

Guest appearances 
 Nicolás Poblete as Emilio Mendoza
 Sebastián Layseca as Mariano Lobos
 Óscar Hernández as Arzobispo de Santiago
 Hugo Vásquez as Coronel Valdenegro
 Pancho González as Doctor de Clemente

Reception

Television ratings

References

External links 
  

Chilean telenovelas
2010 telenovelas
2010 Chilean television series debuts
2010 Chilean television series endings
Televisión Nacional de Chile telenovelas
Costume drama television series
Spanish-language telenovelas